The Exodus (Hebrew: יציאת מצרים,) is the founding myth of the Israelites whose narrative is spread over four books of the Torah (or Pentateuch, corresponding to the first five books of the Bible), namely Exodus, Leviticus, Numbers, and Deuteronomy. The majority of modern scholars date the composition of the Torah to the Middle Persian Period (5th century BCE). Some of the traditions contributing to this narrative are older, since allusions to the story are made by 8th-century BCE prophets such as Amos and Hosea.

The consensus of modern scholars is that the Pentateuch does not give an accurate account of the origins of the Israelites, who appear instead to have formed as an entity in the central highlands of Canaan in the late second millennium BCE from the indigenous Canaanite culture. Most modern scholars believe that the story of the Exodus has some historical basis, but that any such basis has little resemblance to the story told in the Bible.   

The biblical Exodus is central in Judaism. It is recounted daily in Jewish prayers and celebrated in festivals such as Passover. Early Christians saw the Exodus as a typological prefiguration of resurrection and salvation by Jesus. The narrative has also resonated with various groups in more recent centuries, such as among the early American settlers fleeing religious persecution in Europe, and among African Americans striving for freedom and civil rights.

Biblical presentation of the Exodus 
It tells a story of Israelite enslavement and eventual departure from Egypt, revelations at biblical Mount Sinai, and wanderings in the wilderness up to the borders of Canaan. Its message is that the Israelites were delivered from slavery by Yahweh their god, and therefore belong to him by covenant.

Narrative

The story of the Exodus is told in the first half of Exodus, with the remainder recounting the 1st year in the wilderness, and followed by a narrative of 39 more years in the books of Leviticus, Numbers, and Deuteronomy, the last four of the first five books of the Bible (also called the Torah or Pentateuch). In the first book of the Pentateuch, the Book of Genesis, the Israelites had come to live in Egypt in the Land of Goshen during a famine due to the fact that an Israelite, Joseph, had become a high official in the court of the pharaoh. Exodus begins with the death of Joseph and the ascension of a new pharaoh "who did not know Joseph" (Exodus 1:8).

The pharaoh becomes concerned by the number and strength of Israelites in Egypt and enslaves them, commanding them to build at two "supply" or "store cities" called Pithom and Rameses (Exodus 1:11). The pharaoh also orders the slaughter at birth of all male Hebrew children. One Hebrew child, however, is rescued by being placed in a basket on the Nile. He is found and adopted by Pharaoh's daughter, who names him Moses. Moses eventually kills an Egyptian he sees beating a Hebrew slave, and is forced to flee to Midian, marrying Tzipporah, a daughter of the Midianite priest Jethro. The old pharaoh dies and a new one ascends the throne.

Moses, in Midian, goes to Mount Horeb, where Yahweh appears in a burning bush and commands him to go to Egypt to free the Hebrew slaves and bring them to the promised land in Canaan. Yahweh also speaks to Moses's brother Aaron; they both assemble the Israelites and perform signs so that they believe in Yahweh's promise. Moses and Aaron then go to the pharaoh and ask him to let the Israelites go into the desert for a religious festival, but the pharaoh refuses and commands the Israelites to make bricks without straw and increases their workload. Moses and Aaron return to the pharaoh and this time ask him to free the Israelites. The pharaoh then refuses to let the Israelites go.

After this, Yahweh begins inflicting the Plagues of Egypt on the Egyptians for each time that Moses goes to Pharaoh and Pharaoh refuses to release the Israelites. Pharaoh's magicians are able to replicate the first plagues, in which Yahweh turns the Nile to blood and produces a plague of frogs, but are unable to reproduce any plagues starting with the third, the plague of gnats. After each plague Pharaoh allows the Israelites to worship Yahweh to remove the plague, then refuses to free them. 

Moses is then commanded to fix the first month of Aviv at the head of the Hebrew calendar.  He instructs the Israelites to take a lamb on the 10th day of the month, slaughter it on the 14th, and daub its blood on their doorposts and lintels, and to observe the Passover meal that night, the night of the full moon. In the final plague, Yahweh kills all the firstborn sons of Egypt and the firstborn cattle, but the Israelites, with blood on their doorposts, are spared.  Yahweh commands that the Israelites observe a festival as "a perpetual ordinance" to remember this event (Exodus 12:14).

Pharaoh finally casts the Israelites out of Egypt after his firstborn son is killed. Yahweh leads the Israelites in the form of a pillar of cloud in the day and a pillar of fire at night. However, once the Israelites have left, Yahweh "hardens" Pharaoh's heart. Pharaoh then changes his mind and pursues the Israelites to the shore of the Red Sea. Moses uses his staff to part the Red Sea, and the Israelites cross on dry ground, but the sea closes down on the pursuing Egyptians, drowning them all.

The Israelites begin to complain, and Yahweh miraculously provides them with water and food, eventually raining manna down for them to eat. The Amalekites attack at Rephidim, but are defeated. Jethro (Moses' father-in-law) convinces Moses to appoint judges for the tribes of Israel. The Israelites reach the Sinai Desert and Yahweh calls Moses to Mount Sinai, where Yahweh reveals himself to his people and establishes the Ten Commandments and Mosaic covenant: the Israelites are to keep his torah (i.e. law, instruction), and in return he will give them the land of Canaan.

Yahweh establishes the Aaronic priesthood and various rules for ritual worship, among other laws. However, in Moses's absence the Israelites sin against Yahweh by creating the idol of a golden calf, and as retaliation Yahweh has the Levites kill three thousand people (Exodus 32:28), and Yahweh sends a plague on the Israelites. The Israelites now accept the covenant, which is reestablished, build a tabernacle for Yahweh, and receive their laws. Yahweh commands Moses to take a census of the Israelites and establishes the duties of the Levites. Then the Israelites depart from Mount Sinai.

Yahweh commands Moses to send twelve spies ahead to Canaan to scout the land. The spies discover that the Canaanites are strong, and, believing that the Israelites cannot defeat them, the spies falsely report to the Israelites that Canaan is full of giants so that the Israelites will not invade (Numbers 13:31-33). The Israelites refuse to go to Canaan, so Yahweh manifests himself and declares that the generation that left Egypt will have to pass away before the Israelites can enter Canaan. The Israelites will have to remain in the wilderness for forty years, and Yahweh kills the spies through a plague except for the righteous Joshua and Caleb, who will be allowed to enter the promised land. A group of Israelites led by Korah, son of Izhar, rebels against Moses, but Yahweh opens the earth and sends them living to Sheol.

The Israelites come to the oasis of Kadesh Barnea, where Miriam dies and the Israelites remain for forty years. The people are without water, so Yahweh commands Moses to get water from a rock by speaking to it, but Moses strikes the rock with his staff instead, for which Yahweh forbids him from entering the promised land. Moses sends a messenger to the king of Edom requesting passage through his land to Canaan, but the king refuses. The Israelites then go to Mount Hor, where Aaron dies. The Israelites try to go around Edom, but the Israelites complain about lack of bread and water, so Yahweh sends a plague of poisonous snakes to afflict them. 

After Moses prays for deliverance, Yahweh has him create the brazen serpent, and the Israelites who look at it are cured. The Israelites are soon in conflict with various other kingdoms, and king Balak of Moab attempts to have the seer Balaam curse the Israelites, but Balaam blesses the Israelites instead. Some Israelites begin having sexual relations with Moabite women and worshipping Moabite gods, so Yahweh orders Moses to impale the idolators and sends a plague. The full extent of Yahweh's wrath is averted when Phinehas impales an Israelite and a Midianite woman having intercourse (Numbers 25:7-9). Yahweh commands the Israelites to destroy the Midianites, and Moses and Phinehas take another census. They then conquer the lands of Og and Sihon in Transjordan, settling the Gadites, Reubenites, and half the Tribe of Manasseh there.

Moses then addresses the Israelites for a final time on the banks of the Jordan River, reviewing their travels and giving them further laws. Yahweh tells Moses to summon Joshua, whom Yahweh commissions to lead the conquest of Canaan. Yahweh tells Moses to ascend Mount Nebo, from where he sees the promised land and where he dies.

Covenant and law
The climax of the Exodus is the covenant (binding legal agreement) between God and the Israelites mediated by Moses at Sinai: Yahweh will protect the Israelites as his chosen people for all time, and  the Israelites will keep Yahweh's laws and worship only him. The covenant is described in stages: at Exodus 24:3–8 the Israelites agree to abide by the "book of the covenant" that Moses has just read to them; shortly afterwards God writes the "words of the covenant" – the Ten Commandments – on stone tablets; and finally, as the people gather in Moab to cross into Canaan, the land God has promised them, Moses makes a new covenant between Yahweh and the Israelites "beside the covenant he made with them at Horeb" (Deuteronomy 29:1). The laws are set out in a number of codes:
 Ethical Decalogue (i.e., the Ten Commandments), Exodus 20 and Deuteronomy 5;
 The Book of the Covenant, Exodus 20:22–23:3;
 Ritual Decalogue, Exodus 34;
 The ritual laws of Leviticus 1–6 and Numbers 1–10;
 The Holiness Code, Leviticus 17–26;
 Deuteronomic Code, Deuteronomy 12–26.

Origins and historicity 

There are two main positions on the historicity of the Exodus in modern scholarship. The majority position is that the biblical Exodus narrative has some historical basis, although there is little of historical worth in it. The other position, often associated with the school of Biblical minimalism, is that the biblical exodus traditions are the invention of the exilic and post-exilic Jewish community, with little to no historical basis. 

The biblical Exodus narrative is best understood as a founding myth of the Jewish people, providing an ideological foundation for their culture and institutions, not an accurate depiction of the history of the Israelites. The view that the biblical narrative is essentially correct unless it can explicitly be proved wrong (Biblical maximalism) is today held by "few, if any [...] in mainstream scholarship, only on the more fundamentalist fringes."  There is no direct evidence for any of the people or Exodus events in non-biblical ancient texts or in archaeological remains, and this has led most scholars to omit the Exodus events from comprehensive histories of Israel.

Reliability of the biblical account 
Mainstream scholarship no longer accepts the biblical Exodus account as history for a number of reasons. Most scholars agree that the Exodus stories were written centuries after the apparent setting of the stories. The Book of Exodus itself attempts to ground the event firmly in history, dating the exodus to the 2666th year after creation (Exodus 12:40-41), the construction of the tabernacle to year 2667 (Exodus 40:1-2, 17), stating that the Israelites dwelled in Egypt for 430 years (Exodus 12:40-41), and including place names such as Goshen (Gen. 46:28), Pithom, and Ramesses (Exod. 1:11), as well as stating that 600,000 Israelite men were involved (Exodus 12:37). 

The Book of Numbers further states that the number of Israelite males aged 20 years and older in the desert during the wandering were 603,550, including 22,273 first-borns, which modern estimates put at 2.5-3 million total Israelites, a number that could not be supported by the Sinai Desert through natural means. The geography is vague with regions such as Goshen unidentified, and there are internal problems with dating in the Pentateuch.  No modern attempt to identify an historical Egyptian prototype for Moses has found wide acceptance, and no period in Egyptian history matches the biblical accounts of the Exodus. Some elements of the story are miraculous and defy rational explanation, such as the Plagues of Egypt and the Crossing of the Red Sea. The Bible did not mention the names of any of the pharaohs involved in the Exodus narrative, making it difficult for modern scholars to match Egyptian history and the biblical narrative.

While ancient Egyptian texts from the New Kingdom mention "Asiatics" living in Egypt as slaves and workers, these people cannot be securely connected to the Israelites, and no contemporary Egyptian text mentions a large-scale exodus of slaves like that described in the Bible. The earliest surviving historical mention of the Israelites, the Egyptian Merneptah Stele (c. 1207 BCE), appears to place them in or around Canaan and gives no indication of any exodus. Archaeologists Israel Finkelstein and Neil Asher Silberman say that archaeology has not found any evidence for even a small band of wandering Israelites living in the Sinai: "The conclusion – that Exodus did not happen at the time and in the manner described in the Bible – seems irrefutable [...] repeated excavations and surveys throughout the entire area have not provided even the slightest evidence." Instead, modern archaeology suggests continuity between Canaanite and Israelite settlement, indicating a primarily Canaanite origin for Israel, with no suggestion that a group of foreigners from Egypt comprised early Israel.

Potential historical origins 

Despite the absence of any archaeological evidence, most scholars nonetheless hold the view that the Exodus probably has some sort of historical basis, with Kenton Sparks referring to it as "mythologized history". Scholars posit that a small group of people of Egyptian origin may have joined the early Israelites, and then contributed their own Egyptian Exodus story to all of Israel. William G. Dever cautiously identifies this group with the Tribe of Joseph, while Richard Elliott Friedman identifies it with the Tribe of Levi.  

Most scholars who accept a historical core of the exodus date this possible exodus group to the thirteenth century BCE at the time of Ramses II, with some instead dating it to the twelfth century BCE at the time of Ramses III. Evidence in favor of historical traditions forming a background to the Exodus myth include the documented movements of small groups of Ancient Semitic-speaking peoples into and out of Egypt during the Eighteenth and Nineteenth Dynasties, some elements of Egyptian folklore and culture in the Exodus narrative, and the names Moses, Aaron and Phinehas, which seem to have an Egyptian origin. Scholarly estimates for how many people could have been involved in such an exodus range from a few hundred to a few thousand people.

Joel S. Baden noted the presence of Semitic-speaking slaves in Egypt who sometimes escaped in small numbers as potential inspirations for the Exodus. It is also possible that oppressive Egyptian rule of Canaan during the late second millennium BCE may have aided the adoption of the story of a small group of Egyptian refugees by the native Canaanites among the Israelites. The expulsion of the Hyksos, a Semitic group that had conquered much of Egypt, by the Seventeenth Dynasty of Egypt is also frequently discussed as a potential historical parallel or origin for the story. Alternatively, Nadav Na'aman argued that oppressive Egyptian rule of Canaan during the Nineteenth and especially the Twentieth Dynasty may have inspired the Exodus narrative, forming a "collective memory" of Egyptian oppression that was transferred from Canaan to Egypt itself in the popular consciousness.

Many other scholars reject this view, and instead see the biblical exodus traditions as the invention of the exilic and post-exilic Jewish community, with little to no historical basis. Lester Grabbe, for instance, argued that "[t]here is no compelling reason that the exodus has to be rooted in history", and that the details of the story more closely fit the seventh through the fifth centuries BCE than the traditional dating to the second millennium BCE. Philip R. Davies suggested that the story may have been inspired by the return to Israel of Israelites and Judaeans who were placed in Egypt as garrison troops by the Assyrians in the fifth and sixth centuries BCE.

Development and final composition

Early traditions

The earliest traces of the traditions behind the exodus appear in the northern prophets Amos and Hosea, both active in the 8th century BCE in  northern Israel, but their southern contemporaries Isaiah and Micah show no knowledge of an exodus ( contains a reference to the exodus, which many scholars take to be an addition by a later editor); while Jeremiah, active in the 7th century, mentions both Moses and the Exodus.

The story may, therefore, have originated a few centuries earlier, perhaps in the 9th or 10th BCE, and there are signs that it took different forms in Israel, in the Transjordan region, and in the southern Kingdom of Judah before being unified in the Persian era. The Exodus narrative was most likely further altered and expanded under the influence of the return from the Babylonian captivity in the sixth century BCE.

Evidence from the Bible suggests that the Exodus from Egypt formed a "foundational mythology" or "state ideology" for the Northern Kingdom of Israel. The northern psalms 80 and 81 state that God "brought a vine out of Egypt" (Psalm 80:8) and record ritual observances of Israel's deliverance from Egypt as well as a version of part of the Ten Commandments (Psalm 81:10-11). The Books of Kings records the dedication of two golden calves in Bethel and Dan by the Israelite king Jeroboam I, who uses the words "Here are your gods, O Israel, which brought you up out of the land of Egypt" (1 Kings 12:28). Scholars relate Jeroboam's calves to the golden calf made by Aaron of Exodus 32. Both include a nearly identical dedication formula ("These are your gods, O Israel, who brought you up out of the land of Egypt", Exodus 32:8). This episode in Exodus is "widely regarded as a tendentious narrative against the Bethel calves". Egyptologist Jan Assmann suggested that event, which would have taken place around 931 BCE, may be partially historical due to its association with the historical pharaoh Sheshonq I (the biblical Shishak). Stephen Russell dated this tradition to "the eighth century BCE or earlier", and argued that it preserves a genuine Exodus tradition from the Northern Kingdom, but in a Judahite recension. Russell and Frank Moore Cross argued that the Israelites of the Northern Kingdom may have believed that the calves at Bethel and Dan were made by Aaron. Russell suggested that the connection to Jeroboam may have been later, possibly coming from a Judahite redactor. Pauline Viviano, however, concluded that neither the references to Jeroboam's calves in Hosea (Hosea 8:6 and 10:5) nor the frequent prohibitions of idol worship in the seventh-century southern prophet Jeremiah show any knowledge of a tradition of a golden calf having been created in Sinai.

Some of the earliest evidence for Judahite traditions of the exodus is found in Psalm 78, which portrays the Exodus as beginning a history culminating in the building of the temple at Jerusalem. Pamela Barmash argued that the psalm is a polemic against the Northern Kingdom; as it fails to mention that kingdom's destruction in 722 BCE, she concluded that it must have been written before then. The psalm's version of the Exodus contains some important differences from what is found in the Pentateuch: there is no mention of Moses, there are only seven plagues in Egypt, and the manna is described as "food of the mighty" rather than as bread in the wilderness. Nadav Na'aman argued for other signs that the Exodus was a tradition in Judah before the destruction of the northern kingdom, including the Song of the Sea and Psalm 114, as well as the great political importance that the narrative came to assume there.
A Judahite cultic object associated with the exodus was the brazen serpent or nehushtan: according to 2 Kings 18:4, the brazen serpent had been made by Moses and was worshiped in the temple in Jerusalem until the time of king Hezekiah of Judah, who destroyed it as part of a religious reform, possibly around 727 BCE. In the Pentateuch, Moses creates the brazen serpent in Numbers 21:4-9. Meindert Dijkstra wrote that while the historicity of the Mosaic origin of the Nehushtan is unlikely, its association with Moses appears genuine rather than the work of a later redactor. Mark Walter Bartusch noted that the nehushtan is not mentioned at any prior point in Kings, and suggests that the brazen serpent was brought to Jerusalem from the Northern Kingdom after its destruction in 722 BCE.

Composition of the Torah narrative
The revelation of God on Sinai appears to have originally been a tradition unrelated to the Exodus. Joel S. Baden noted that "[t]he seams [between the Exodus and Wilderness traditions] still show: in the narrative of Israel's rescue from Egypt there is little hint that they will be brought anywhere other than Canaan – yet they find themselves heading first, unexpectedly, and in no obvious geographical order, to an obscure mountain." In addition, there is widespread agreement that the revelation of the law in Deuteronomy was originally separate from the Exodus: the original version of Deuteronomy is generally dated to the 7th century BCE. The contents of the books of Leviticus and Numbers are late additions to the narrative by priestly sources.

Scholars broadly agree that the publication of the Torah (or Pentateuch) took place in the mid-Persian period (the 5th century BCE), echoing a traditional Jewish view which gives Ezra, the leader of the Jewish community on its return from Babylon, a pivotal role in its promulgation. Many theories have been advanced to explain the composition of the first five books of the Bible, but two have been especially influential. The first of these, Persian Imperial authorisation, advanced by Peter Frei in 1985, is that the Persian authorities required the Jews of Jerusalem to present a single body of law as the price of local autonomy. Frei's theory was demolished at an interdisciplinary symposium held in 2000, but the relationship between the Persian authorities and Jerusalem remains a crucial question. The second theory, associated with Joel P. Weinberg and called the "Citizen-Temple Community", is that the Exodus story was composed to serve the needs of a post-exilic Jewish community organized around the Temple, which acted in effect as a bank for those who belonged to it. The books containing the Exodus story served as an "identity card" defining who belonged to this community (i.e., to Israel), thus reinforcing Israel's unity through its new institutions.

Hellenistic Egyptian parallel narratives
Writers in Greek and Latin during the Ptolemaic period (late 4th century BCE–late 1st century BCE) record several Egyptian tales of the expulsion of a group of foreigners that were connected to the Exodus. These tales often include elements of the Hyksos period and most are extremely anti-Jewish. The earliest non-biblical account is that of Hecataeus of Abdera (c. 320 BCE), as preserved in the first century CE Jewish historian Josephus in his work Against Apion and in a variant version by the first-century BCE Greek historian Diodorus. Hecataeus tells how the Egyptians blamed a plague on foreigners and expelled them from the country, whereupon Moses, their leader, took them to Canaan. In this version, Moses is portrayed extremely positively. Manetho, as preserved in Josephus's Against Apion, tells how 80,000 lepers and other "impure people", led by a priest named Osarseph, join forces with the former Hyksos, now living in Jerusalem, to take over Egypt. They wreak havoc until the pharaoh and his son chase them out to the borders of Syria, where Osarseph gives the lepers a law code and changes his name to Moses. The identification of Osarseph with Moses in Manetho's account may be an interpolation or may come from Manetho. Other versions of the story are recorded by the first-century BCE Egyptian grammarian Lysimachus of Alexandria, who set the story in the time of Pharaoh Bakenranef (Bocchoris), the first-century CE Egyptian historian Chaeremon of Alexandria, and the first-century BCE Gallo-Roman historian Gnaeus Pompeius Trogus. The first-century CE Roman historian Tacitus included a version of the story that claims that the Hebrews worshipped a donkey as their god in order to ridicule Egyptian religion, whereas the Roman biographer Plutarch claimed that the Egyptian god Seth was expelled from Egypt and had two sons named Juda and Hierosolyma.

It is possible that the stories represent a polemical Egyptian response to the Exodus narrative. Egyptologist Jan Assmann proposed that the story comes from oral sources that "must [...] predate the first possible acquaintance of an Egyptian writer with the Hebrew Bible." Assmann suggested that the story has no single origin but rather combines numerous historical experiences, notably the Amarna and Hyksos periods, into a folk memory. There is general agreement that the stories originally had nothing to do with the Jews. Erich S. Gruen suggested that it may have been the Jews themselves that inserted themselves into Manetho's narrative, in which various negative actions from the point of view of the Egyptians, such as desecrating temples, are interpreted positively.

Religious and cultural significance

In Judaism

Commemoration of the Exodus is central to Judaism, and Jewish culture. In the Bible, the Exodus is frequently mentioned as the event that created the Israelite people and forged their bond with God, being described as such by the prophets Hosea, Jeremiah, and Ezekiel. The Exodus is invoked daily in Jewish prayers and celebrated each year during the Jewish holidays of Passover, Shavuot, and Sukkot. The fringes worn at the corners of traditional Jewish prayer shawls are described as a physical reminder of the obligation to observe the laws given at the climax of Exodus: "Look at it and recall all the commandments of the Lord" (Numbers). The festivals associated with the Exodus began as agricultural and seasonal feasts but became completely subsumed into the Exodus narrative of Israel's deliverance from oppression at the hands of God.

For Jews, the Passover celebrates the freedom of the Israelites from captivity in Egypt, the settling of Canaan by the Israelites, and the "passing over" of the angel of death during the death of the first-born. Passover involves a ritual meal called a Seder during which parts of the exodus narrative are retold. In the Hagaddah of the Seder it is written that every generation is obliged to remind and identify itself in terms of the Exodus. Thus the following words from the Pesaḥim (10:5)  are recited: "In every generation a person is duty-bound to regard himself as if he personally has gone forth from Egypt." Because the Israelites fled Egypt in haste without time for bread to rise, the unleavened bread matzoh is eaten on Passover, and homes must be cleansed of any items containing leavening agents, known as Chametz.

Shavuot celebrates the granting of the Law to Moses on Mount Sinai; Jews are called to rededicate themselves to the covenant on this day. Some denominations follow Shavuot with The Three Weeks, during which the "two most heinous sins committed by the Jews in their relationship to God" are mourned: the Golden Calf and the doubting of God's promise by the Twelve Spies. A third Jewish festival, Sukkot, the Festival of Booths, is associated with the Israelites living in booths after they left their previous homes in Egypt. It celebrates how God provided for the Israelites while they wandered in the desert without food or shelter. It is celebrated by building a sukkah, a temporary shelter also called a booth or tabernacle, in which the rituals of Sukkot are performed, recalling the impermanence of the Israelites' homes during the desert wanderings.

In Christianity
The Christian ritual of the eucharist and the holiday of Easter draw directly on the imagery of the Passover and the Exodus. In the New Testament, Jesus is frequently associated with motifs of the Exodus. The Gospel of Mark has been suggested to be a midrash on the Exodus, though the scholar Larry Perkins thinks this unlikely. Mark suggests that the outpouring of Jesus' blood creates a new covenant (Mark 14:24) in the same way that Moses' sacrifice of bulls had created a covenant (Exodus 24:5). In the Gospel of Matthew, Jesus reverses the direction of the Exodus by escaping from the Massacre of the Innocents committed by Herod the Great before himself returning from Egypt (Matt 2:13-15). Other parallels in Matthew include that he is baptized by water (Matt 3:13-17), and tested in the desert; unlike the Israelites, he is able to resist temptation (Matt. 4.1-3). The Gospel of John repeatedly calls Jesus the Passover lamb (John 1:29, 13:1, 19:36), something also found in 1 Peter (1 Pet 1:18-20), and 1 Corinthians (1 Cor 5:7-8). Michael Graves calls Paul's discussion of the exodus in 1 Corinthians 5:7-8 and his comparison of the early church in Corinth to the Israelites in the desert "[t]he two most significant NT passages touching on the exodus". John also refers to Jesus as manna (John 6:31-5), water flowing from a rock in the desert (John 7:37-9), and as a pillar of fire (John 8:12). Early Christians frequently interpreted actions taken in the Exodus, and sometimes the Exodus as a whole, typologically to prefigure Jesus or actions of Jesus.

In Romans 9:17, Paul interprets the hardened heart of Pharaoh during the Plagues of Egypt as referring to the hardened hearts of the Jews who rejected Christ. Early Christian authors such as Justin Martyr, Irenaeus, and Augustine all emphasized the supersession of the Old Covenant of Moses by the New Covenant of Christ, which was open to all people rather than limited to the Jews.

As historical inspiration 
A number of historical events and situations have been compared to the Exodus. Many early American settlers interpreted their flight from Europe to a new life in America as a new exodus. American "founding fathers" Thomas Jefferson and Benjamin Franklin recommended for the Great Seal of the United States to depict Moses leading the Israelites across the Red Sea. African Americans suffering under slavery and racial oppression interpreted their situation in terms of the Exodus, making it a catalyst for social change. South American Liberation theology also takes much inspiration from the Exodus.

See also

 Book of Joshua, the continuation of the narrative in the conquest of Canaan
 Ipuwer Papyrus
 List of films related to the Exodus
 Moses in Islam
 Stations of the Exodus
 Va'eira, Bo (parashah), and Beshalach: Torah portions (parashot) telling the Exodus story
 The Exodus Decoded

Notes

References

Citations

Bibliography

External links

 Old maps showing the route of the Exodus, The National Library of Israel, Eran Laor Cartographic Collection

 
Egypt in the Hebrew Bible
Book of Exodus
 
Jewish mythology
Moses
Origin myths
Passover
Sacred history